Soft Work, is a 2020 Nigerian action heist film directed and produced by Darasen Richards. The film stars Alexx Ekubo and Frank Donga in the lead roles whereas Akin Lewis, Shafy Bello, Sanni Mu’azu and IK Ogbonna made supportive roles. The film revolves around Chief Ademuyiwa, an accomplished businessman with over eighteen companies, whose success is attributed to a code, but centered on a heist targeted at him by Dare Olusegun, an attractive conman.

The film made its premiere on 27 March 2020 in Lagos. The film received mixed reviews from critics.

Cast
 Alexx Ekubo as Dare Olusegun
 Frank Donga as Chief Ademuyiwa
 Akin Lewis
 Shafy Bello
 Sanni Mu’azu
 IK Ogbonna
 Mofe Duncan

References

External links 
 

2020 films
English-language Nigerian films
2020 drama films
Nigerian drama films
2020s English-language films